Usad is a rural locality (a selo) in Biektaw District, Tatarstan. The population was 1095 as of 2010.

Usad is located 12 km north of Biektaw, district's administrative centre, and 33 km north of Qazan, republic's capital, by road.

The earliest known record of the settlement dates from 1677. It forms part of the district since 1965.

There are 26 streets in the viilage.

References

External links 
 

Rural localities in Vysokogorsky District